Adam Chen (born 24 June 1976) is a Singaporean television and film actor.

Early life
Chen was educated at The Chinese High School and Hwa Chong Junior College. Whilst a civil engineering student at the National University of Singapore he did some modelling and joined Route to Glamour, a talent show organised by SPH MediaWorks. He was offered a contract and joined MediaWorks after graduating.

Acting career
Before going into acting, Chen worked as a model for numerous print and television commercials in Singapore. 

In 2001, Chen participated in the Chinese talent competition, Route to Glamour, by SPH MediaWorks' Channel U. He was then signed by SPH Mediaworks to be an artiste for Channel U. 

In 2003, Chen extended his contract with SPH Mediaworks for one year and then in 2004, extended for another three years.

He earned himself a role in the Singapore-Hong Kong co-produced TV series Yummy Yummy in 2005, before proceeding to work together with other famous actors such as Nicholas Tse, Dicky Cheung and Li Yapeng in TV series jointly produced by Singapore and other countries. 

When SPH MediaWorks closed in 2005, he was transferred to MediaCorp, which SPH had merged with. Chen has also acted in English language TV dramas produced by MediaCorp Channel 5.

Business career 
In 2002, Chen and his friends set up a merchandising company.

In 2009, Chen opened two Japanese burger restaurants, R Burger, in the town area. The chain closed in 2013. He also owns Three Kings Kitchen, a duck and chicken rice stall with three outlets.

In 2013, Chen and his friends spent $500,000 to open Park Cafe at Holland Village, Singapore. He later opened a Japanese izakaya, Ikki Izakaya, at Metropolis of Star Vista, One-north. Chen also has a yakitori restaurant, Birders.

He is also the owner of bar chain, Five, which has four outlets and also a bistro, Golden, located in arthouse cinema, The Projector, at Golden Mile Tower.

Beside the food and beverage business, Chen also owns Japanese watch boutique, Maker’s Watch Knot, in Tiong Bahru.

Filmography

Films

Television series

Variety shows

Awards and nominations

References

External links
Profile on xin.msn.com

Hwa Chong Junior College alumni
Hwa Chong Institution alumni
National University of Singapore alumni
Singaporean male film actors
Singaporean male television actors
1976 births
Living people
Singaporean people of Chinese descent